Preston-Dartmouth was a provincial electoral district in  Nova Scotia, Canada, that elects one member of the Nova Scotia House of Assembly. The riding was created in 2012 as Dartmouth-Preston, with 100 per cent of the former district of Preston, 10 per cent of the former district of Cole Harbour, 9 per cent of the district of Dartmouth East and 3 per cent of the district of Eastern Shore.  A private member's bill in May 2013 changed the name to Preston-Dartmouth.

The district now includes part of the Westphal area from the former district of Cole Harbour and the Ross Road area from the Eastern Shore district. The western part of the district includes the area north of Main Street and east of Caledonia Road, until Geovex Court. The former district of Preston, which takes in areas of suburban affluence and rural poverty, was created in 1993 to give black Nova Scotians a better chance of representation in the legislature. Approximately one third of the district's residents are black. It includes historically important black communities at North Preston, East Preston and Cherrybrook. Many people in this riding work in Metro Halifax in the trade and service sectors.

Members of the Legislative Assembly
This riding has elected the following Members of the Legislative Assembly:

Election results

|-

|Liberal
|Keith Colwell
|align="right"|3,326 
|align="right"|58.39
|align="right"|
|-

|New Democratic Party
|André Cain
|align="right"|1,816
|align="right"|31.88
|align="right"| 
|-

|Progressive Conservative
|Andrew J. Mecke
|align="right"|554
|align="right"|9.73
|align="right"|

|}

References

External links
 2013 riding profile

Nova Scotia provincial electoral districts
2012 establishments in Nova Scotia